Tiariturris is a genus of small predatory sea snails, marine gastropod mollusks in the family Pseudomelatomidae. This species was discovered in the gulf of Panama in 1958 by Berry.

Species
Species within the genus Tiariturris include:
 Tiariturris libya  (Dall, 1919)
 † Tiariturris oschneri (Anderson & Martin, 1914) 
 Tiariturris spectabilis Berry, 1958

References

 Berry, S.S. (1958) Notices of new Eastern Pacific Mollusca.-II. Leaflets in Malacology, 1, 83–90.
 Nomenclator Zoologicus info

External links
 
 Bouchet, P.; Kantor, Y. I.; Sysoev, A.; Puillandre, N. (2011). A new operational classification of the Conoidea (Gastropoda). Journal of Molluscan Studies. 77(3): 273-308
 Worldwide Mollusc Species Data Base: Pseudomelatomidae

 
Pseudomelatomidae
Gastropod genera